Pseudeustrotia carneola, the pink-barred lithacodia moth, is a moth of the family Noctuidae. The species was first described by Achille Guenée in 1852. It is found in North America, where it has been recorded from Nova Scotia and New Brunswick west to Alberta and Colorado, south to the Gulf of Mexico. The habitat consists of woodland edges, mesic meadows and grasslands regions.

The wingspan is 20–24 mm. The forewings are dark black-brown with a mottled pale tan and pale grey outer third. The forewings are crossed diagonally by a wide pale pink band, which meets the pale terminal area. The hindwings are light grey or grey brown. Adults are on wing from May to September.

The larvae feed on Rumex (including Rumex patientia), Polygonum and Solidago species.

References

External links

Acontiinae
Moths described in 1852
Moths of North America
Taxa named by Achille Guenée